The Special Power Excursion Reactor Test Program (SPERT) was a series of tests focusing on the safety of nuclear reactors. It was commissioned in 1954 by the U.S. Atomic Energy Commission, to be run by the Phillips Petroleum Company.

Reactors

SPERT-I 
The SPERT-I reactor became operational in July 1955, with the first tests being performed in September.

SPERT-II 
The SPERT-II reactor became operational in March 1960.

References

External links 
 by SPERT researcher

Nuclear safety and security